Gasteranthus carinatus is a species of flowering plant in the family Gesneriaceae. It is a shrub or subshrub endemic to Ecuador. Its natural habitats are subtropical or tropical moist lowland forests and subtropical or tropical moist montane forests.

References

Endemic flora of Ecuador
carinatus
Endangered plants
Taxonomy articles created by Polbot